Michael Nason (born June 9, 1981 in Pickering, Ontario) is a Canadian professional ice hockey coach and a former professional ice hockey player. He is currently serving as head coach of the Dutch team UNIS Flyers Heerenveen.

Playing career 
Nason played at the AAA-, Metro Junior A- and OHL level in his native Canada and then started his college career at Manhattanville College in Purchase, New York. After one year with the "Valiants", he transferred to the University of Toronto, where he played until 2005. In 2004-05, his final year at "U of T", Nason made the OUA Second Team, garnered OUA East Most Sportsmanlike honors and was selected to play for Canada at the 2005 World University Games in Austria.

After concluding his college career, Nason entered the pro ranks and signed with the Eisbären Juniors Berlin, the development team of German powerhouse Eisbären Berlin, for the 2005-06 season. Playing under coach Jeff Tomlinson in 36 Oberliga games, he tallied 15 goals and 27 assists.

He spent the 2006-07 campaign with the Bossier-Shreveport Mudbugs of the Central Hockey League and then took his game to the Netherlands. From 2007 to 2013, Nason turned out for the Friesland Flyers.

Coaching career 
In his native Canada, Nason coached at hockey schools and camps. While playing professionally for the Friesland Flyers in the Netherlands, he coached youth teams of the organization. In September 2015, Nason was named head coach of the Friesland Flyers' men's team, which competes in the Dutch top-flight Eredivisie and in the BeNeLiga, a league composed of Belgian and Dutch teams. Nason is also serving as director of the Flyers' youth program and has been an assistant coach of the under-16 Dutch national team since 2014.

External links 
 http://www.eliteprospects.com/staff.php?staff=23851
 https://www.linkedin.com/in/mike-nason-00186a79

References 

1981 births
Living people
Ice hockey people from Ontario
Canadian ice hockey coaches
Eisbären Berlin players
People from Pickering, Ontario
Manhattanville College alumni